Colorado Biz or Colorado Business Magazine is a Colorado monthly-magazine. It is dedicated to coverage of the economy of Colorado, business, finance and technology. It is read mainly by people in business.

Each year, ColoradoBiz does extensive research, collects industry data and facilitates reader voting to produce various business rankings.

External links
Official site

Business magazines published in the United States
Monthly magazines published in the United States
Magazines established in 1973
Magazines published in Colorado